Arnica latifolia is a species of arnica in the sunflower family, known by the common names broadleaf arnica, broad leaved arnica, mountain arnica,  and daffodil leopardbane. It is native to western North America from Alaska east to Northwest Territories and south to Mono County, California, and Taos County, New Mexico. It grows in mountain habitat such as forest and meadows.

Arnica latifolia is a perennial herb growing from a long rhizome and producing a hairy, mostly naked stem 10 to 50 centimeters tall. It has a cluster of leaves around its base and usually a few pairs along the lower part of the stem. The leaves are lance-shaped to broad and nearly heart-shaped, and are usually toothed.

The inflorescence contains one or more daisy-like flower heads lined in glandular phyllaries. Each has a center of yellow disc florets and several yellow ray florets up to 3 centimeters long. The fruit is an achene with a white pappus.

The plant was first described in 1832 by German-Russian botanist Gustav Heinrich von Bongard, based on material collected near Sitka, now in Alaska (then called Russian America).

The species could be confused with the similar Arnica cordifolia, from which it can be distinguished by the leaves.

References

External links
Jepson Manual Treatment
United States Department of Agriculture Plants Profile
calphotos Photo gallery, University of California

latifolia
Flora of Subarctic America
Plants described in 1832
Flora of Western Canada
Flora of the Northwestern United States
Flora of the Southwestern United States
Flora without expected TNC conservation status